Bill(s) may refer to:

Common meanings
 Banknote, paper cash (especially in the United States)
 Bill (law), a proposed law put before a legislature
 Invoice, commercial document issued by a seller to a buyer
 Bill, a bird or animal's beak

Places
 Bill, Wyoming, an unincorporated community, United States
 Billstown, Arkansas, an unincorporated community, United States
 Billville, Indiana, an unincorporated community, United States

People
 Bill (given name)
 Bill (surname)
 Bill (footballer, born 1978), Alessandro Faria, Togolese football forward
 Bill (footballer, born 1984), Rosimar Amâncio, a Brazilian football forward
 Bill (footballer, born 1999), Fabricio Rodrigues da Silva Ferreira, a Brazilian forward

Arts, media, and entertainment

Characters
 Bill (Kill Bill), a character in the Kill Bill films
 William “Bill“ S. Preston, Esquire, The first of the titular duo of the Bill & Ted film series
 A lizard in Lewis Carroll's Alice's Adventures in Wonderland
 A locomotive with a twin called, Ben in The Railway Series and Thomas & Friends
 Bill the Cat, a Bloom County character
 Bill Cipher, a demon in Gravity Falls
 Bill the Pony and his previous owner Bill Ferny in the novel The Lord of the Rings
 Bill Potts (Doctor Who), a female companion of the twelfth Doctor in Doctor Who
 Bill Sikes, main antagonist from Oliver Twist
 Mr. Bill, a claymation character on Saturday Night Live
 Sour Bill, a character from Wreck-It Ralph
Bill Kerman, fictional character in the computer game Kerbal Space Program

Films
 Bill (1981 film), a 1981 TV film starring Mickey Rooney
 Bill: On His Own, 1983 sequel to the 1981 film
 Bill (2015 film), an adventure-comedy film about Shakespeare from the cast of Horrible Histories
 Bill, the Galactic Hero (film), 2014 science student fiction film based on the 1965 Harry Harrison novel
 Meet Bill, a 2007 comedy film formerly known as Bill
 The Bill, a long-running British police TV drama series

Music

Albums
 Bill (Bill Cosby album), 1973
 Bill (Bill Anderson album), 1973
 Bill (Tripping Daisy album), 1992

Songs
 "Bill" (song), a song from the 1927 musical Show Boat
 "Bills" (song), a 2015 by LunchMoney Lewis
 "Bills, Bills, Bills", a 1999 song by Destiny's Child

 "Bill", a 1996 song by Peggy Scott-Adams
 "Bills", a 1960 song by Louis Jordan
 "Bills", a 1962 song by Denny Denson
 "The Bills", a 1997 piano composition by Carter Pann

Printed media
 Bill, the Galactic Hero, a 1965 science fiction novel by American writer Harry Harrison
 Bill, the Galactic Hero on the Planet of Bottled Brains, a 1990 novel by Harry Harrison and Robert Sheckley
 "Bill, the Ventriloquial Rooster", an 1898 sketch story by Australian writer Henry Lawson
 "The Bill" (short story), a 2013 short story by Hungarian writer László Krasznahorkai

Television
 The Bill, a British police procedural television series
 The Bill (Inside No. 9), an episode of the British television series Inside No. 9.

Weapons
 Bill (weapon), a weapon similar to a halberd
 BILL Anti-tank guided weapon, a Swedish anti-tank weapon
 BILL 2 Anti-tank guided weapon, a Swedish anti-tank weapon

Other uses
 Bill (United States Congress)
 Bill the Goat, the mascot of the US Naval Academy
 The Bill (band)
 Bills (subculture), a Congolese youth subculture in the late 1950s, idolising cowboy Western movies
 Bill's, a British restaurant chain 
 Buffalo Bills, an American NFL football team
 Tropical Storm Bill, a list of storms

See also
 Bili (disambiguation)
 Billie (disambiguation)
 Billy (disambiguation)
 Little Bill (disambiguation)
 Will (disambiguation)
 William (disambiguation)